Derrick Gardner (born June 3, 1965) is an American jazz trumpeter from Chicago, Illinois.

Gardner began playing trumpet at the age of 9 in his hometown of Chicago. In 1991, he moved to New York City and played with groups such as the Count Basie Orchestra, Frank Foster's Loud Minority Band, Harry Connick, Jr.'s Big Band, Roman Schwaller's European Sextet, and the Smithsonian Jazz Masterworks Orchestra.

Gardner has gone on to work with such jazz notables as the late Dizzy Gillespie, George Benson, Jon Faddis, Nancy Wilson, Tony Bennett, Joe Williams, Rufus Reid, Clark Terry, Kenny Barron, Stefon Harris and James Moody.

Critics have described him as "having a way of moving past the notes in a solo and getting into formal realms that make sense and heighten interest." Another critic describes him as "Soulful and Intelligent, a tremendous talent with a vivid and unusual imagination."

As a composer and arranger, Gardner's music has been featured with The Count Basie Orchestra, The Jazz Heritage Orchestra, The Brad Leali Big Band, Michigan State University Jazz Ensembles, Ohio State University Jazz Ensembles, University of Manitoba Jazz Ensembles.

Since 1989, Derrick has written for and led his own sextet, Derrick Gardner & the Jazz Prophets. In 2008, Gardner signed the group to Indianapolis jazz label Owl Studios and has since released two albums on the label, 2008's A Ride to the Other Side, and 2009's Echoes of Ethnicity, which was the winner of the Best Jazz Album award at the 9th Annual Independent Music Awards "Echoes of Ethnicity".

As of July 2011, Gardner is associate professor of trumpet in the University of Manitoba's Jazz Studies program.

Discography

References

External links
 Website
 Owl Music Group
 Myspace

Living people
American jazz composers
American male jazz composers
American jazz bandleaders
American jazz trumpeters
American male trumpeters
Bebop trumpeters
African-American musicians
Count Basie Orchestra members
Musicians from Chicago
1965 births
Independent Music Awards winners
Owl Studios artists
Jazz musicians from Illinois